Gretzky NHL 06 is an ice hockey video game featuring professional NHL player Wayne Gretzky. It was developed by Page 44 Studios and published by Sony Computer Entertainment for PlayStation 2 and PlayStation Portable. Mike Emrick and Darren Pang provide color commentary for the game. It is the only game in the Gretzky NHL series to feature officially licensed NHL on NBC branding during gameplay. The NBC integration was later used in the EA Sports NHL series, beginning with NHL 14 in 2013. The PS2 version features Wayne Gretzky on the cover in an Edmonton Oilers and New York Rangers uniform, as well as himself as a coach.

Reception 

The game received "mixed or average reviews" on both platforms according to the review aggregation website Metacritic.

References

External links 

2005 video games
Multiplayer and single-player video games
National Hockey League video games
Page 44 Studios games
PlayStation 2 games
PlayStation Portable games
Sony Interactive Entertainment games
Video games developed in the United States
Wayne Gretzky games